James Cannon (born 2 October 1953) is a Scottish retired footballer.

Along with several other promising young Scottish players he was signed as an apprentice for Crystal Palace in October 1970, by then manager Bert Head, having previously had a trial with Manchester City. He made a goalscoring debut on 31 March 1973 against Chelsea and went on to make 660 appearances for the club, beating Terry Long's record in the 1984–85 season.

A cultured centre half who could also play at left back or in midfield, he eventually left the club at the end of the 1987–88 season (15 seasons after his debut), having been captain for the previous ten seasons, and initially joined Croydon F.C. and then in November 1988, Dartford. He also had a short spell with Bristol Rovers before finishing his football career in 1994 after three seasons at Dulwich Hamlet. In retirement he owned  a building company ICS Builders in the Croydon area, and managed Chipstead during the 2003–04 season.

At the start of 2005–06 season onwards, he made a return to Palace, in the hospitality department, hosting the executive boxes at Selhurst Park on matchdays. In 2005, Cannon was voted into Palace's Centenary XI, and was only just pipped to "The Player of The Century" award by Ian Wright. Wright would later claim that Cannon had bullied him and Kung fu kicked him in the back, Cannon disputed that account but admitted to giving Wright “a little slap”.

References

External links
 

1953 births
Scottish footballers
Living people
Crystal Palace F.C. players
Bristol Rovers F.C. players
Croydon F.C. players
Dartford F.C. players
Dulwich Hamlet F.C. players
Association football central defenders
Footballers from Glasgow
English Football League players
English football managers
Chipstead F.C. managers